Phyllonorycter melhaniae is a moth of the family Gracillariidae. It is known from Zimbabwe and South Africa.

The length of the forewings is 2.4–2.8 mm. The forewings are elongate and the ground colour is ochreous with white markings. The hindwings are greyish pale beige and slightly shiny. The fringe is pale beige. Adults are on wing from mid-April to mid-May.

The larvae feed on Melhania velutina. They mine the leaves of their host plant. The mine has the form of a moderate, oblong, opaque, tentiform mine on the underside of the leaf.

References

melhaniae
Lepidoptera of South Africa
Lepidoptera of Zimbabwe
Moths of Sub-Saharan Africa
Moths described in 1912